Tamás Kátai is a Hungarian avant-garde musician and professional photographer. He has been in a number of different bands, including the avant-garde post-black metal group Thy Catafalque, and has also released solo material.

During the 2010s Kátai used to reside in Edinburgh. Beside his musical career, he has also worked as English teacher and as a professional language interpreter for NHS. By the 2020s, he moved back to Hungary.

Discography

As a member

Darklight (solo)
Holocaust in Fairyland – Demo, 1994
The Shades Inside – Demo, 1994
Aeternus – Demo, 1995
Tinctures of Nightfall – Demo, 1995
In Igne Et Terra – Demo, 1996
Feast of November Dawn – Demo, 1997
Virrasztanak a holtak... – EP, 1999
Theatrum October – Full-length, 1999

Gire
Energire – Demo, 1999	
Hét Madár – Demo, 2000	
Metabiosis – Demo, 2002	
V – Demo, 2003	
Nádak, erek – Demo, 2004	
Gire – Full-length, 2007

Gort
Forest Myths – EP, 2000

Tamás Kátai (solo)
Erika Szobája – Full-length, 2006
Slower Structures – Full-length, 2016
Jupiter 92 – Full-length, 2022

Thy Catafalque
Cor Cordium – Demo, 1999
Sublunary Tragedies – Full-length, 1999
Microcosmos – Full-length, 2001
Tűnő Idő Tárlat – Full-length, 2004
Róka Hasa Rádió – Full-length, 2009
Rengeteg – Full-length, 2011
Sgùrr – Full-length, 2015
Meta – Full-length, 2016
Geometria – Full-length, 2018
Naiv – Full-length, 2020
Vadak – Full-length, 2021

Neolunar
Neolunar – Full-length, 2016

Towards Rusted Soil (solo)
Forsaken in Fog – Demo, 2000
A Landscape Slumbering – Demo, 2003

Guest appearance

Nebron
Promo 2000 – Demo, 2000

CasketGarden
Incompleteness in Absence – Full-length, 2008

Awards 
 Hungarian Metal Awards 2007 – best metal album of the year (Gire "Gire").

See also 
List of ambient music artists

References

External links
 Tamás Kátai MySpace page
 Tamás Kátai photo gallery
 Tamás Kátai Encyclopaedia Metallum page

1975 births
Living people
Experimental musicians
Hungarian metal musicians
Hungarian photographers